Urumi 2 Weir' is a small diversion dam constructed across Poyilingalpuzha in Thiruvambady village of Kozhikode district in Kerala, India. The weir is constructed across the Poyilingalpuzha river, downstream of Urumi I power house to divert water to Urumi II power house. This is located in Thiruvambady, 50 km away from Kozhikode town. The water from the reservoir is drawn to the Power House through a power channel 470 m long. The Urumi falls near the dam has become a tourist attraction after the hydro electric project came into existence.

Specifications 

 LocationLatitude:11⁰22’22”N
 Longitude:76⁰3’30.4”E
 Panchayath : Thiruvambady
 Village : Thiruvambady
 District : Kozhikode
 River Basin : Chaliyar
 River : Poyilingalpuzha
 Release from Dam to river
 Taluk through which release flows : Thamarassery
 Year of completion : 2004
 Name of Project : UrumiSHEP Stage II 
 Purpose of Project : Hydro Power
 Installed capacity of the Project : 3 x 0.8 MW.

Dam Features

 Type of Dam : Diversion weir
 Classification : Weir
 Maximum Water Level (MWL) : EL 107.1 m
 Full Reservoir Level ( FRL) : EL 107.1 m
 Storage at FRL : Diversion only
 Height from deepest foundation : 5.6m
 Length : 25.0 m
 Spillway : Not provided
 Crest LevelEL 107.1 m
 River Outlet :
 Officers in charge & phone No. : Executive Engineer, KG Division, Kakkayam, PIN-673615 Phone.9446008466

References 

Dams in Kerala
Dams completed in 2004